The 107th Pennsylvania House of Representatives District is located in the Coal Region and has been represented since 2023 by Joanne Stehr.

District profile
The 107th Pennsylvania House of Representatives District is located in Northumberland County and Schuylkill County. It is made up of the following areas:

 Northumberland County
 Coal Township
 East Cameron Township
 Jackson Township
 Jordan Township
 Herndon
 Little Mahanoy Township
 Lower Augusta Township
 Lower Mahanoy Township
 Kulpmont
 Marion Heights
 Mount Carmel
 Mount Carmel Township
 Ralpho Township
 Shamokin 
 Shamokin Township
 Upper Mahanoy Township
 Washington Township
 West Cameron Township
 Zerbe Township
 Schuylkill County
 Barry Township
 Eldred Township
 Foster Township
 Frailey Township
 Hegins Township
 Hubley Township
 Pine Grove
 Pine Grove Township
 Porter Township
 Reilly Township
 Tower City
 Tremont
 Tremont Township
 Upper Mahantongo Township
 Washington Township

Representatives

Recent election results

References

External links
District map from the United States Census Bureau
Pennsylvania House Legislative District Maps from the Pennsylvania Redistricting Commission.  
Population Data for District 107 from the Pennsylvania Redistricting Commission.

Government of Columbia County, Pennsylvania
Government of Montour County, Pennsylvania
Government of Northumberland County, Pennsylvania
107